Gabon competed in the 2008 Summer Olympics held in Beijing, People's Republic of China, from August 8 to August 24, 2008.

Athletics

Men

Women

Key
Note–Ranks given for track events are within the athlete's heat only
Q = Qualified for the next round
q = Qualified for the next round as a fastest loser or, in field events, by position without achieving the qualifying target
NR = National record
N/A = Round not applicable for the event
Bye = Athlete not required to compete in round

Judo

Taekwondo

References

Nations at the 2008 Summer Olympics
2008
Olympics